Chennai Central–Thiruvananthapuram Central Mail is a daily Superfast Express mail train running between Thiruvananthapuram and Chennai Central under Southern Railway zone that connects the Capital city of Tamilnadu with the Capital City of Kerala. It is one of the prestigious train of the Indian Railways. This train runs via Kottayam. This train connects Chennai and Thiruvananthapuram along with six big cities in South India – Salem, Erode, Coimbatore, Thrissur, Kochi,Chengannur and Kollam.

History
Today's 12623/24 Chennai–Thiruvananthapuram Mail, is the successor to the 561/562 Cochin Harbour Terminus (in Kochi) –Madras Express that started running in 1944. It was then the second express train running through Kerala and the first from south Kerala. In 1960, it was renumbered as the 19/20 Cochin Harbour Terminus–Madras Express and in 1965 renamed the 19/20 Cochin Harbour Terminus–Madras Mail. It was then extended to Thiruvananthapuram Central in 1977 when the rail link connecting to Thiruvananthapuram Central via Kottayam was completed and in 1990 it was renumbered 6319/6320 and later 2623/2624.

Interesting facts

It is the only daily train from Chennai to the South which does not have a halt at both Arakkonam Junction and Jolarpettai. 
The train was made to run via Irugur Podanur line due to single line constraints at Coimbatore Junction, later it was restored via Coimbatore Junction in 2014. This is the fastest train as 12623 between MAS - CBE and MAS - ERN. The train is meant for achieving its maximum speed between Katpadi and Salem Junction. 

Conventional ICF coaches on the train were replaced by LHB coaches in January 2017. The train usually left from PF no: 5 of Chennai Central till 2018. Later when the maintenance got shifted to SA Division / CBE Base, Consequently, The train has untidy rakes and now leaves from PF 9 of Chennai Central. This train is amongst the prestigious trains of the Southern Railway zone.  

Total number of coaches 22

The train consists of:
 Loco HOG-enabled WAP-7 from Royapuram or Erode
 1 AC First AC Coach (H1)
 1 AC Two-tier coaches(A1)
 6 AC Three-tier coaches (B1, B2, B3, B4, B5, B6)
 9 Sleeper coaches (S1–S9)
 3 Unreserved General Sitting coaches (GS)
 1 End on Generator
 1 Luggage Cum LHB Second Sitting and Coach for Disabled

Coach composition (Upward – 12623)

The train shares its rake with Cheran Superfast Express.

Traction

Earlier hauled by Arakkonam WAM-4 till  and then change to diesel ALCO towards Thiruvananthapuram Central, later it was provided with WAP-4 till  thereafter completed its journey to Thiruvananthapuram Central with twin diesel ALCO.
After the electric traction till Thiruvananthapuram Central, the same was hauled by WAP-4
It is now hauled by a WAP-7 of Royapuram shed or Erode shed.

In popular culture
No.20 Madras Mail, which is a Malayalam movie released in 1990 has most of the scenes shot inside the moving Thiruvananthapuram Mail train.

References

Named passenger trains of India
Rail transport in Kerala
1940 establishments in India
Transport in Chennai
Transport in Thiruvananthapuram
Rail transport in Tamil Nadu
Thiruvananthapuram